is a Buddhist temple in Minō city, north of Osaka, Japan.

According to an English language brochure given out at the temple, the site was first occupied late in the Nara period by two priests, Zenchū and Zensan. The Miroku-ji temple was erected in 765 CE. The name "Katsuō-ji" was given by the Emperor Seiwa. The temple was burned in 1184 CE. The present Main Hall and Temple Gate were rebuilt by Hideyori Toyotomi.

Katsuō-ji is the 23rd temple in the Kansai Kannon Pilgrimage.

"Winner's Luck" and Daruma
The word "katsu" in the temple's name refers to winning. People buy daruma dolls hoping to obtain "winner's luck". If the wish is fulfilled, the daruma is often returned to the temple and left somewhere on the grounds.

References

External links

Katsuō-ji Homepage

Buddhist temples in Osaka Prefecture
Important Cultural Properties of Japan
Historic Sites of Japan
Kōyasan Shingon temples